William Bromley (1769–1842) was a British engraver. Bromley, who was born at Carisbrooke on the Isle of Wight, was apprenticed to an engraver named J G Wooding in London, and soon attracted favorable notice.

Of his early works the most popular are the prints in 'Macklin's Bible,' and his engravings of Stothard's designs illustrating the 'History of England.' He engraved also two of Sir Thomas Lawrence's portraits of the Duke of Wellington, and one of the young Napoleon.

Bromley was elected an associate engraver of the Royal Academy in 1819, and was employed for many years by the trustees of the British Museum in engraving the Elgin Marbles after drawings by Henry Corbould (1787–1844). He was the grandfather of 19th-century British artist Valentine Walter Bromley.

Notes

References
 

Attribution:

External links
 
Artwork by William Bromley III 

1769 births
1842 deaths
People from Newport, Isle of Wight
18th-century engravers
19th-century engravers
British engravers
Associates of the Royal Academy
Elgin Marbles